Coffee is a 2022 Indian Marathi-language film directed by Nitin Kamble and produced by Tanvi Films. Story and screenplay is by Machindra Bugade. It stars Siddharth Chandekar, Spruha Joshi and Kashyap Parulekar in lead roles.

Plot
A happily married woman develops feelings for a charming young man on a business trip. As she does not hide anything from her husband, things get complicated when she explains how she feels to her husband.

Cast 
 Siddharth Chandekar as Rohit 
 Spruha Joshi as Renuka 
 Kashyap Parulekar as Ranjeet
 Mohan Joshi
 Kailash Sorari as Rohit's friend 
 Madhura Vaidya as Sneha

Reception

Critical reception 
Coffee received mixed reviews from critics. The Preeti Atulkar of Entertainment Times rate 2.5 and reviewed as The acting of all the three central characters is good enough.  Spruha, however, is in the lead. Siddharth looks handsome, and performs very calmly.  But the scenes between Spruha and Kashyap, where they engage in long conversations, are quite interesting. Despite Spruha and Siddharth being seen together more often in the film, the chemistry between the former and Kashyap is pretty good.

With a monotonous beginning but an effective climax, this film is worth a one-time watch. Suyog Zore of Cinestaan is rate 2 out of five and written about film "Coffee is a film that squanders an opportunity to deal with complex relationship issues in a realistic manner and would have worked if the writer had given equal importance to all the three characters". Kalpeshraj Kubal of Maharashtra Times rate 2.5 The film is not very flashy. Limitations in production value are felt. The technical side is also fine; But for Spruha-Siddharth there is no problem watching this film. The message in the second half of the film, which is actually a twist, is instructive for today's young couples.

Soundtrack 
The music was composed by Trupti Chavan and the lyrics were penned by Nitin Kamble.

References

External links 
 
 Coffee at Rotten Tomatoes

2022 films
2020s Marathi-language films